Sakka Podu Podu Raja is a 2017 Indian Tamil-language action comedy film directed by Sethuraman and produced by VTV Ganesh. The film features Santhanam, Vaibhavi Shandilya and Vivek in the leading roles. Featuring cinematography by Abinandhan Ramanujam and edited by Anthony, the film began production in October 2016. This film is a remake of the 2014 Telugu movie Loukyam, starring Gopichand, Rakul Preet Singh, Sampath Raj (who reprises his role in this film), Mukesh Rishi and Brahmanandam.

Plot
Santa (Santhanam) helps his friend Saravana (Dr. Sethuraman) to elope with his lover who happens to be the sister of a local don Bhavani (Sampath). Knowing this, Bhavani vows to revenge Santa and keeps searching for him. Meanwhile, Santa meets Yazhini (Vaibhavi), a college student and gets attracted towards her. After some initial fights, Yazhini also falls for Santa. One day, Yazhini is chased by a few goons and there comes Bhavani and saves her. It is revealed that Yazhini is the youngest sister of Bhavani which shocks Santa.  A small flashback is shown where there is an enmity prevailing between another don Das (Sharath Lohitashwa) who wants to kill Bhavani’s sisters as Bhavani refused to marry Das’ only sister which lead to her death.

Santa comes up with a plan to win the heart of Bhavani. As Bhavani has not seen Santa, he decides to use it as an advantage. As per plan, Santa introduces to Bhavani as a land lord and lets him stay at his place. Santa gets close to Bhavani and stages another drama and makes Bhavani accept the wedding of Saravana and Bhavani’s sister. Bhavani arranges Yazhini’s wedding with Karthik (Narayan), who was supposedly to marry Yazhini’s sister. Now, Santa finds that Karthik is none other than the son of Das and their plan to trouble Yazhini post wedding as a means of revenge against Bhavani. A fight ensues and Bhavani understands Das’ plan. Finally, Santa is married to Yazhini.

Cast

Production

In October 2016, VTV Ganesh announced that he would finance a film directed by newcomer Sethuraman, which would feature Santhanam and Vaibhavi Shandilya in the lead roles. The film was launched with a small ceremony during the middle of the month and the lead pair in attendance. In early November 2016, it was announced that production had begun and Ganesh had signed on comedian Vivek to play a supporting role, while Sampath Raj and Robo Shankar joined the cast.

In November 2016, the team approached A. R. Rahman to work on the film as music composer. After the composer turned down the request, VTV Ganesh also enquired with Anirudh Ravichander before signing on Harris Jayaraj. Later, Santhanam announced that actor STR will make his debut as composer in the film. Sharing the news on his Twitter page on Sunday, Santhanam wrote: "It's my godfather and wonderful human Silambarasan, who is going to compose music for first time for this film 'Sakka Podu Podu Raja'."

Soundtrack 

Music for the movie was composed by Silambarasan, in his debut as a music composer. The movie consists of a total of 5 songs.

Release
Amazon has acquired the digital rights of Sakka Podu Podu Raja. Baradwaj Rangan of Film Companion wrote "Santhanam’s latest attempt to position himself as a matinee idol pivots on an utterly original plot: the hero falls for a gangster’s sister. "

References

External links
 

2017 films
2010s Tamil-language films
2017 action comedy films
2017 romantic comedy films
Tamil remakes of Telugu films
Indian action comedy films
Indian romantic comedy films
2017 directorial debut films
Films scored by Silambarasan